In enzymology, a glycoprotein-N-acetylgalactosamine 3-beta-galactosyltransferase is an enzyme that catalyzes the chemical reaction

UDP-galactose + glycoprotein N-acetyl-D-galactosamine  UDP + glycoprotein D-galactosyl-1,3-N-acetyl-D-galactosamine

Thus, the two substrates of this enzyme are UDP-galactose and glycoprotein N-acetyl-D-galactosamine, whereas its two products are UDP and glycoprotein D-galactosyl-1,3-N-acetyl-D-galactosamine.

This enzyme belongs to the family of glycosyltransferases, specifically the hexosyltransferases. The systematic name of this enzyme class is UDP-galactose:glycoprotein-N-acetyl-D-galactosamine 3-beta-D-galactosyltransferase. This enzyme is also called uridine diphosphogalactose-mucin beta-(1->3)-galactosyltransferase. This enzyme participates in o-glycan biosynthesis and glycan structures - biosynthesis 1.

See also
 C1GALT1

References

 
 
 

EC 2.4.1
Enzymes of unknown structure